United We Doth is the third and final album from art collective PFFR. It was released on July 29, 2003 by Birdman Records. The album cover art was designed by Scott Hug. The last track is unlisted.

Track listing

References

2003 albums
PFFR albums
Birdman Records albums